Mysore Ananthamurthy Viswamitra (1932–2001) was an Indian molecular biophysicist and crystallographer, known for his pioneering work on the X-ray structural studies of DNA fragments and nucleotide coenzyme molecules. His work is reported to have assisted in the development of the concept of sequence-dependent oligonucleotide conformation. He was an INSA senior scientist and an MSIL chair professor of physics at the Indian Institute of Science and a visiting professor at the University of Cambridge.

Biography 
Born on 14 November 1932, in Shimoga, in the south Indian state of Karnataka, Viswamitra did his early education at the University of Mysore and Banaras Hindu University before securing a PhD from the Indian Institute of Science (IISc) and joined IISc in 1954. He served IISc till his superannuation in 1993 during which time he founded the School of Biocrystallography and the Bioinformatics Centre at the institution. He is reported to have determined the structure of a number of mononucleotides for the first time and, along with Olga Kennard, elucidated the oligonucleotide dp(AT)2 structure leading to the first atomic detail view of a DNA duplex. His studies have been documented by way of a number of articles and ResearchGate, an online repository of scientific articles has listed 141 of them.

Viswamitra was an elected fellow of all the three major Indian science academies viz. the Indian Academy of Sciences, the Indian National Science Academy, and the National Academy of Sciences, India, as well as the World Academy of Sciences (TWAS). He was a recipient of a number of awards which included C. V. Raman Award of the Acoustical Society of India (1982), J. C. Bose Award of the University Grants Commission of India (1984), TWAS Prize (1986), J. C. Bose Medal of the INSA (1986), R.D. Birla National Award (1988), FICCI Award (1991), S. S. Bhatnagar Medal of the Indian National Science Academy (1993), National Citizens Award (1998) and the Distinguished Alumni Award of the Indian Institute of Science (1999).

Viswamitra died, succumbing to a heart attack, on 10 April 2001, at the age of 68, survived by his wife and son. The death occurred immediately after he delivered a public speech at the condolence meeting of his colleague, G. N. Ramachandran.

Selected bibliography

See also 

 Nucleic acid double helix
 List of TWAS Prize laureates

Notes

References

Further reading

External links 
 
 
 

Indian scientific authors
1932 births
2001 deaths
Fellows of the Indian Academy of Sciences
People from Shimoga
Scientists from Karnataka
Indian molecular biologists
Indian crystallographers
TWAS fellows
TWAS laureates
Fellows of The National Academy of Sciences, India
Fellows of the Indian National Science Academy
Indian Institute of Science alumni
Banaras Hindu University alumni
Academic staff of the Indian Institute of Science
University of Mysore alumni